Charles William Gillet (November 26, 1840 – December 31, 1908) was a U.S. Representative from New York.

Biography
He was born in Addison, New York on November 26, 1840. Gillet attended the public schools and the Delaware Literary Institute, Franklin, New York.
He was graduated from Union College, Schenectady, New York, in 1861.
Enlisted as a private in the Eighty-sixth Regiment, New York Volunteer Infantry, in August 1861.
He was promoted to adjutant of the regiment in November 1861.
He was wounded and honorably discharged for physical disability in 1863.
He engaged in the manufacture of sash, doors, and blinds in Addison.
He was appointed postmaster of Addison on June 15, 1878, and served until July 26, 1886.

Gillet was elected as a Republican to the Fifty-third and to the five succeeding Congresses (March 4, 1893 – March 3, 1905).
He served as chairman of the Committee on Expenditures in the Department of Agriculture (Fifty-fourth through Fifty-seventh Congresses), Committee on Public Buildings and Grounds (Fifty-eighth Congress).
He declined to be a candidate for renomination in 1904.
He died in New York City December 31, 1908. He was interred in the Rural Cemetery, Addison, New York.

References

1840 births
1908 deaths
Union College (New York) alumni
United States Army officers
Republican Party members of the United States House of Representatives from New York (state)
New York (state) postmasters
People from Addison, New York
19th-century American politicians